Sojourner Truth: Ain't I a Woman? is a 1992 children's biography by Patricia and Frederick McKissack. It tells the story of African-American abolitionist and women's rights activist, Sojourner Truth.

Reception
The School Library Journal, in a review of Sojourner Truth wrote "With compassion and historical detail, the McKissacks offer a rich profile of Isabella Van Wagener. .. the McKissacks emphasize the condition of African-Americans from 1797-1883, their subject's convictions and magnetism, her contributions to the welfare of her people, and her involvement with other influential abolitionists and activists during the last 40 years of her life."

Sojourner Truth has also been reviewed by Booklist, Kirkus Reviews, and Publishers Weekly.

Awards
1992 CCBC Choice
1993 Boston Globe–Horn Nonfiction Book Award - winner
1993 Coretta Scott King Book Author Award - honor

References

External links
Library holdings of Sojourner Truth: Ain't I a Woman?

1992 children's books
American children's books
American biographies
Children's history books
Books by Patricia McKissack
Sojourner Truth